Hiriyanfushi as a place name may refer to:
 Hiriyanfushi (Dhaalu Atoll) (Republic of Maldives)
 Hiriyanfushi (Thaa Atoll) (Republic of Maldives)